Fergie & Andrew: Behind the Palace Doors is a 1992 British TV film about the courtship between Prince Andrew and Sarah Ferguson.

It was produced by Norman Rosemont.

References

External links
Fergie and Andrew at IMDb
Fergie and Andrew at BFI
Fergie and Andrew at TCMDB

1992 films
1992 television films
British television films